The boys' tournament in 3x3 basketball at the 2018 Summer Youth Olympics was held from 7 to 17 October 2018 at the Parque Mujeres Argentinas in Buenos Aires.

Participating teams

Preliminary round
All times are local (UTC–3).

Pool A

Pool B

Pool C

Pool D

Knockout round

Bracket

Quarterfinals

Semifinals

Third place game

Final

Final standings

References

External links
Medallists 

Boys